The WTA Tier I events are part of the elite tour for professional women's tennis organised by the WTA called the WTA Tour.

Tournaments

Results

Tournament details

Tokyo

Singles

Doubles

Indian Wells

Singles

Doubles

Miami

Singles

Doubles

Hilton Heads

Singles

Doubles

Rome

Singles

Doubles

Berlin

Singles

Doubles

Toronto

Singles

Doubles

Zurich

Singles

Doubles

Moscow

Singles

Doubles

See also 
 WTA Tier I events
 1999 WTA Tour
 1999 ATP Super 9
 1999 ATP Tour

References

External links
 Women's Tennis Association (WTA) official website
 International Tennis Federation (ITF) official website

WTA 1000 tournaments

 Tier 1